Serans may refer to the following places in France:

 Serans, Oise, a commune in the Oise department
 Serans, Orne, a commune in the Orne department